Nick Carter-Killmaster is a series of spy adventures published from 1964 until 1990, first by Award Books, then by Ace Books, and finally by Jove Books. At least 261 novels were published.  The character is an update of a pulp fiction private detective named Nick Carter, first published in 1886.

No actual author is credited for the books, with the Nick Carter name being used as a house pseudonym. Volumes varied between first-person and third-person narratives. Authors known to have contributed entries in the series are Michael Avallone, Valerie Moolman, Manning Lee Stokes, Dennis Lynds, Gayle Lynds, Robert J. Randisi, David Hagberg, and Martin Cruz Smith. The name Nick Carter was acknowledged by the series as having been inspired by the early 20th century pulp fiction detective of the same name in the 100th Killmaster volume (labelled Nick Carter 100) which included an essay on the earlier Nick Carter and included a Nick Carter detective short story alongside a Killmaster adventure.

The title character of the series serves as Agent N3 of AXE, a fictional spy agency for the United States government. The novels are similar to the literary James Bond novels—low on gadgets, high on action. Sexual encounters in particular are described in detail.

The character
The definitive description of Nicholas J. Huntington Carter is given in the first novel in the series, Run, Spy, Run. Carter is tall (over ), lean and handsome with a classic profile and magnificently muscled body. He has wide-set steel gray eyes that are icy, cruel and dangerous. He is hard-faced, with a firm straight mouth, laugh-lines around the eyes, and a firm cleft chin. His hair is thick and dark. He has a small tattoo of a blue axe on the inside right lower arm near the elbow—the ultimate ID for an AXE agent. At least one novel states that the tattoo glows in the dark. Carter also has a knife scar on the shoulder, a shrapnel scar on the right thigh. He has a sixth sense for danger.

Carter served as a soldier in World War II, then with the OSS, before he joined his current employer AXE.

Carter practices yoga for at least 15 minutes a day. Carter has a prodigious ability for learning foreign languages. He is fluent in English (his native tongue), Cantonese, French, German, Greek, Hungarian, Italian, Portuguese, Putonghua (Mandarin), Russian, Sanskrit, Spanish and Vietnamese. He has basic skills in Arabic, Hindi, Japanese, Korean, Romansch, Swahili, and Turkish. In the early novels, Carter often assumes a number of elaborate disguises in order to execute his missions.

Weapons and paraphernalia
Nick Carter uses three main weapons during the course of the series, all of which are named, and have histories. The gun, Wilhelmina, is a stripped-down German Luger. In the earliest stories, Carter got the gun off a German officer during a harrowing mission during World War II. Later stories state that he has had a series of Lugers, all named Wilhelmina. The knife, Hugo, is a pearl-handled 400-year-old stiletto crafted by Benvenuto Cellini. The blade retracts into the handle, and the knife is worn on a special sheath on the wrist, designed to release it into the user's hand with a simple muscle contraction. The third member of the triad is Pierre, a poison gas bomb, which is a small egg-shaped device, usually carried in a pocket but sometimes as a "third testicle" at his scrotum. Activated with a simple twist, it would, within seconds, kill anyone or anything that breathed its odorless and colorless gas.

Carter often takes with him other weapons as the mission demands. These have included:

 Cousin of Pierre: a smaller version of Pierre the poison gas bomb that can be concealed even more easily—described in The China Doll;
 Fang: a poison-tipped needle worn on a concealed index finger cap described in Saigon;
 Pepito: a non-lethal stun grenade used in Checkmate in Rio.
 Tiny Tim: a nuclear grenade "containing half a grain of sand of fissionable matter" used in Istanbul and The Red Guard
 10,000-watt laser pistol used in Hanoi
 Cigarette lighter that fires drugged darts used in Hanoi
 Exploding cigars used in Hanoi

Carter has used a variety of equipment in the novels, most of which have nicknames. These have included:
 Antonio Moreno: a lifelike facemask made of a latex substance called Lastotex (apparently named after Antonio Moreno, the 1920s silent movie star);
 Gladstone: a rhino hide suitcase with multiple concealed compartments;
 Oscar Johnson: a small radio transmitter (unclear if it is named after Oscar Johnson, a baseball player active in the 1920s and 1930s, or Oscar G. Johnson, the World War II Medal of Honor recipient);
 Quantity K: a powerful acid strong enough to destroy evidence/documents;
 Laser torch: for burning through door locks used in The Weapon of Night;
 Singing Sam: a radio receiver concealed in electric razor/electric toothbrush used in Istanbul;
 Wristwatch with UHF transmitter used in Hanoi;
 Triple X tablet: a universal poison antidote and pep pill used in Hanoi;
 Talkalot: a scopolamine-like truth drug used in Danger Key;
 Unnamed injectable knockout drug requiring subsequent injection of antidote to regain consciousness used in The Weapon of Night;
 Store: an injectable drug that induces a week-long state of suspended animation used in Peking & The Tulip Affair

AXE
The agency Carter works for is described as being smaller and far more secret than the CIA, mostly concerned with assassinations. In the first novel of the series, Run, Spy, Run, AXE is described as "the trouble-shooting arm of the US secret services". AXE headquarters are located in the 6th floor offices of a building in DuPont Circle, Washington, DC under the cover of the Amalgamated Press and Wire Service. AXE is purported to contain several different departments with specific functions including Editing (later called "Special Effects and Editing")—headed by Geoffrey Poindexter—which, among other things, creates false biographies for agents and provides appropriate props (e.g. fake latex fingerprints); Documents—whose role is to plant stories in the media to support specific activities and create false identification and travel documents; Records—which provides background information on suspects; and Operations—which provides logistic support for specific missions. AXE has a branch office near Columbus Circle, New York City and affiliate offices in countries around the world.

Agents are given code designations; Carter's N3, which has at least once been stated as standing for Number three, identifies him as one of the elite Killmasters. It has been stated in some novels that there are four Killmasters in AXE, with Carter the most senior. The meaning of the code N3 is described differently in different novels—sometimes it is Carter's personal designation, other times it is considered a rank, with N1 being the highest, while in other novels we are told that Carter is the third Killmaster to have worked for AXE, with both his predecessors having been killed in action.

 David Hawk, described in early novels as looking a lot like Uncle Sam, is the head of AXE and Carter's personal boss.
 Della Stokes, Hawk's personal secretary, is a character similar to Bond's Miss Moneypenny—flirtatious but serious.
 Ginger Bateman is Hawk's personal secretary in later novels.
 Geoffrey Poindexter, AXE's equivalent to Q, runs the Special Effects and Editing department; in charge of weapons, gadgets, disguises, and papers.

AXE agents
In the first novel in the series (Run, Spy, Run), AXE is described as comprising 24 agents. They are identified by alpha-numeric code. The following agents/codes have been described:

Novels

N.B.: The listing here is in series order (not necessarily by publication date, which is given)
 Run, Spy, Run (Feb. 1964) A101F by Michael Avallone/Valerie Moolman
 The China Doll (April 1964) A105F by Michael Avallone/Valerie Moolman
 Checkmate in Rio (May 1964) A110F by Valerie Moolman
 Safari for Spies (Aug. 1964) A114F by Valerie Moolman
 Fraulein Spy (Oct. 1964) A118F by Valerie Moolman
 Saigon (Dec. 1964) A122F by Michael Avallone/Valerie Moolman
 A Bullet for Fidel (March 1965) A130F by Valerie Moolman
 The 13th Spy (May 1965) A139F by Valerie Moolman
 The Eyes of the Tiger (Sept. 1965) A152F by Manning Lee Stokes
 Istanbul (Oct. 1965) A157F by Manning Lee Stokes
 Web of Spies (Jan. 1966) A163F by Manning Lee Stokes
 Spy Castle (Jan. 1966) A166F by Manning Lee Stokes
 The Terrible Ones (May 1966) A172F by Valerie Moolman
 Dragon Flame (May 1966) A173F by Manning Lee Stokes
 Hanoi (1966) A182F by Valerie Moolman
 Danger Key (1966) A183F by Lew Louderback
 Operation Starvation (1966) A197F by Nicholas Browne
 The Mind Poisoners (1966) A198F by Lionel White/Valerie Moolman
 The Weapon of Night (1967) A215F by Valerie Moolman
 The Golden Serpent (1967) A216F by Manning Lee Stokes
 Mission to Venice (1967) A228X by Manning Lee Stokes
 Double Identity (1967) A229X by Manning Lee Stokes
 The Devil's Cockpit (1967) A238X by Manning Lee Stokes
 The Chinese Paymaster (1967) A239X by Nicholas Browne
 Seven Against Greece (Sept 1967) A247X by Nicholas Browne
 A Korean Tiger (1967) A248X by Manning Lee Stokes
 Assignment: Israel (1967) A260X by Manning Lee Stokes
 The Red Guard (1967) A261X by Manning Lee Stokes
 The Filthy Five (Nov 1967) A276X by Manning Lee Stokes
 The Bright Blue Death (1967) A277X by Nicholas Browne
 Macao (1968) A294X by Manning Lee Stokes
 Operation Moon Rocket (1968) A295X by Lew Louderback
 Judas Spy (April 1968) A325X  by William L Rohde
 Hood of Death (1968) A326X by  William L Rohde
 Amsterdam (1968) A366X by  William L Rohde
 Temple Of Fear (Oct 1968) A367X by Manning Lee Stokes
 14 Seconds to Hell (Nov 1968) A376X by Jon Messmann
 The Defector (1969) A405X by George Snyder
 Carnival for Killing (1969) A406X by Jon Messmann
 Rhodesia (1968) A409X by William L Rohde
 The Red Rays (1969) A423X by Manning Lee Stokes
 Peking & The Tulip Affair (1969) A424X by Arnold Marmor
 The Amazon (1969) A441X by Jon Messmann
 Sea Trap (1969) A442X by Jon Messmann
 Berlin (1969) A455X by Jon Messmann
 The Human Time Bomb (July 1969) A456X by William L Rohde
 The Cobra Kill (1969) A495X by Manning Lee Stokes
 The Living Death (Sept. 1969) A496X by Jon Messmann
 Operation Che Guevara (1969) A509X by Jon Messmann
 The Doomsday Formula (Nov. 1969) A520X by Jon Messmann
 Operation Snake (Dec. 1969) A559X by Jon Messmann
 The Casbah Killers (1969) A560X by Jon Messmann
 The Arab Plague (a.k.a. The Slavemaster in the U.K.) (Feb. 1970) A583X by Jon Messmann
 Red Rebellion (1970) A584X by Jon Messmann
 The Executioners (April 1970) A598X by Jon Messmann
 Black Death (March 1970) A631X by Manning Lee Stokes
 Mind Killers (1970) A655X by Jon Messmann
 Time Clock of Death (June 1970) A656X by George Snyder
 Cambodia (1970) A686X by George Snyder
 The Death Strain (Aug. 1970) A703S by Jon Messmann
 Moscow (1970) A710S by George Snyder
 Jewel of Doom (1970) A744S by George Snyder
 Ice Bomb Zero (March 1971) A787S by George Snyder
 Mark of Cosa Nostra (1971) A847S by George Snyder
 The Cairo Mafia (Aug. 1972) AN1001 by Ralph Eugene Hayes
 Inca Death Squad (Sept. 1972) AN1016 by Martin Cruz Smith
 Assault on England (Oct. 1972) AN1030 by Ralph Eugene Hayes
 The Omega Terror (Nov. 1972) AN1033 by Ralph Eugene Hayes
 Code Name: Werewolf (Jan. 1973) AN1055 by Martin Cruz Smith
 Strike Force Terror (1972) AN1056 by Ralph Eugene Hayes
 Target: Doomsday Island (Feb. 1973) AN1075 By Richard Hubbard
 Night of the Avenger (April 1973) AN1079 by Chet Cunningham
 Butcher of Belgrade (April 1973) AN1109 by Ralph Eugene Hayes / Larry Powell
 Assassination Brigade (April 1973) AN1121 by Thomas Chastain
 The Liquidator (1973) AN1127 by Richard Hubbard
 The Devil's Dozen (1973) AN1133 by Martin Cruz Smith
 The Code (1973) AN1146 by Larry Powell
 Agent Counter-Agent (July 1973) AN1147 by Ralph Eugene Hayes
 Hour of the Wolf (Aug. 1973) AN1157 by Jeffrey Wallman
 Our Agent in Rome is Missing (1973) AN1160 by Al Hine
 The Kremlin File (Sept. 1973) AN1165 by Willis T Ballard
 Spanish Connection (Sept. 1973) AN1166 by Bruce Cassidy
 Death's Head Conspiracy (1973) AN1178 by Robert Colby
 The Peking Dossier (Dec. 1973) AN1217 by Linda Stewart
 Ice-trap Terror (1974) AN1227 by Jeffrey Wallman
 Assassin: Code Name Vulture (Jan. 1974) AN1239 by Ralph Eugene Hayes
 Massacre in Milan (March 1974) AN1251 by Al Hine
 Vatican Vendetta (1974) AN1263 by George Snyder / Ralph Eugene Hayes
 Sign of the Cobra (1974) AN1270 by James Fritxhand
 The Man Who Sold Death (1974) AN1297 by Lawrence VanGelder
 The N3 Conspiracy (Aug. 1974) AQ1332 by Dennis Lynds
 Beirut Incident (1974) AQ1333 by Forrest V Perrin
 Death of the Falcon (1974) AQ1354 by Jim Bowser
 The Aztec Avenger (1974) AQ1356 by Saul Wernick
 The Jerusalem File (1975)AQ1400 by Linda Stewart
 Dr. Death (1975) AY1424 by Craig Nova
 Counterfeit Agent (1975) AQ1439 by Douglas Marland
 Six Bloody Summer Days (1975) AQ1449 by DeWitt S Copp
 The Z Document (1975) AQ1460 by Homer H Morris
 The Katmandu Contract (1975)AQ1479 by Jim Bowser
 The Ultimate Code (1975) AQ1486 by William Odell
 Assignment: Intercept (1976) AQ1512 by Marilyn Granbeck
 Green Wolf Connection (1976) AQ1546 by Dennis Lynds
 Death Message: Oil 74-2 (1976) AQ1559 by Dee Stuart / Ansel Chapin
 The List (1976) AQ1556 by Jim Bowser
 The Fanatics of Al Asad (1976) AQ1575 by Saul Wernick
 The Snake Flag Conspiracy (1976) AQ1576 by Saul Wernick
 The Turncoat (1976) AQ1581 by Leon Lazarus
 The Sign of the Prayer Shawl (1976) AQ1590 by David Hagberg
 The Vulcan Disaster (1976) AQ1600 by George Warren
 A High Yield in Death (1976) AQ1609 by Jim Bowser
 The Nichovev Plot (1976) AQ1623 by Craig Nova
 Triple Cross (1976) AQ1636 by Dennis Lynds
 The Gallagher Plot (1976) AQ1647 by Saul Wernick
 Plot for the Fourth Reich (Jan. 1977) AQ1655 by Bob Latona
 Revenge of the Generals (June 1978) (AQ1664 Feb 1977 Cancelled) by Saul Wernick
 Under the Wall (July 1978) (AQ1673 March 1977 cancelled)  by DeWitt S Copp
 The Ebony Cross (Aug. 1978) AQ1683 (April 1977 cancelled) by Jack Canon
 Deadly Doubles (Sept. 1978) (AQ1695 May 1977 cancelled) by Lawrence VanGelder
 Race of Death (Oct. 1978) by David Hagberg
 Trouble in Paradise (Nov. 1978) by Robert Derek Steeley
 Pamplona Affair (Dec. 1978) by Dee Stuart/Ansel Chapin
 The Doomsday Spore (Jan. 1979) by George Warren
 The Asian Mantrap (Feb. 1979) by William Odell
 Thunderstrike in Syria (March 1979) By Joseph Rosenberger
 The Redolmo Affair (April 1979) by Jack Canon
 The Jamaican Exchange (May 1979) by Leon Lazarus
 Tropical Deathpact (June 1979) by Bob Stokesberry
 The Pemex Chart (July 1979) by Dwight V Swain
 Hawaii (Sept. 1979) by Daniel C Prince
 The Satan Trap (Oct. 1979) by Jack Canon
 Reich Four (Nov. 1979) by Fred Huber
 The Nowhere Weapon (Dec. 1979) by William Odell
 Strike Of The Hawk (Jan 1980) by Joseph L Gilmore
 Day Of The Dingo (April 1980) by John Stevenson
 And Next The King (May 1980) by Steve Simmons
 Tarantula Strike (June 1980) by Dan Reardon
 Ten Times Dynamite (July 1980) by Frank Adduci jr
 Eighth Card Stud (Aug. 1980) by Robert E. Vardeman
 Suicide Seat (Sept. 1980) by George Warren
 Death Mission: Havana (Oct. 1980) by Ron Felber
 War From The Clouds (Nov. 1980) by Joseph L Gilmore
 Turkish Bloodbath (Dec. 1980) by Jerry Ahern
 The Coyote Connection (Feb. 1981) by Bill Crider/Jack Davis
 The Q Man (March 1981) by John Stevenson
 The Society Of Nine (April 1981) by Jack Canon
 The Ouster Conspiracy (May 1981) by David Hagberg
 The Golden Bull (June 1981) by John Stevenson
 The Dubrovnik Massacre (July 1981) by Henry Rasof/Stephen Williamson
 The Solar Menace (Aug. 1981) by Robert E. Vardeman
 The Strontium Code (Sept. 1981) by David Hagberg
 Pleasure Island (Oct. 1981) by Robert J Randisi
 Cauldron Of Hell (Nov. 1981) by Mike Jahn
 The Parisian Affair (Dec. 1981) by H Edward Husenburger
 Chessmaster (Jan. 1982) by Robert J Randisi
 The Last Samurai (Feb. 1982) by Bruce Algozin
 The Puppet Master (March 1982) by David Hagberg
 The Dominican Affair (March 1982) by David Hagberg
 The Damocles Threat (March 1982) by David Hagberg
 Earth Shaker (March 1982) by Robert E. Vardeman
 The Treason Game (March 1982) by Joseph L Gilmore
 Deathlight (March 1982) by Jerry Ahern
 The Israeli Connection (March 1982) by Robert Derek Steeley
 Norwegian Typhoon (April 1982) by Robert E. Vardeman
 The Hunter (May 1982) by David Hagberg
 Operation: McMurdo Sound (June 1982) by David Hagberg
 Appointment In Haiphong (July 1982) by David Hagberg
 Retreat For Death (Aug. 1982) by David Hagberg
 The Mendoza Manuscript (Sept. 1982) by Robert J Randisi
 The Death Star Affair (Oct. 1982) by Jack Canon
 Doctor DNA (Nov. 1982) by Robert E. Vardeman
 The Christmas Kill (Jan. 1983) by Joseph L Gilmore
 The Greek Summit (Feb. 1983) by Robert J Randisi
 The Outback Ghosts (March 1983) by Robert E. Vardeman
 Hide And Go Die (April 1983) by Jack Canon
 The Kali Death Cult (May 1983) by Robert E. Vardeman
 Operation Vendetta (June 1983) by Joseph L Gilmore
 The Yukon Target (July 1983) by Robert E. Vardeman
 The Death Dealer (Aug. 1983) by Jack Canon
 The Istanbul Decision (Sept. 1983) by David Hagberg
 The Decoy Hit (Oct. 1983) by Robert J Randisi
 Earthfire North (Nov. 1983) by David Hagberg
 The Budapest Run (Dec. 1983) by Jack Canon
 Caribbean Coup (Jan. 1984)  by Robert J Randisi
 The Algarve Affair (Feb. 1984) by Jack Canon
 Zero-Hour Strike Force (March 1984) by David Hagberg
 Operation Sharkbite (April 1984) by Jack Canon
 Death Island (May 1984) by David Hagberg
 Night of the Warheads (June 1984) by Jack Canon
 Day of the Mahdi (July 1984) by Gayle Lynds
 Assignment: Rio (August 1984) by Jack Canon
 Death Hand Play (Sept. 1984) by David Hagberg
 The Kremlin Kill (Oct. 1984)  Jack Canon
 The Mayan Connection (Nov. 1984) by Gayle Lynds
 San Juan Inferno (Dec. 1984) by Joseph L Gilmore
 Circle of Scorpions (Jan. 1985) by Jack Canon
 The Blue Ice Affair (Feb. 1985) by Ron Felber
 The Macao Massacre (March 1985) by Jack Canon
 Pursuit of the Eagle (April 1985) by Gayle Lynds
 The Vengeance Game (May 1985) by David Hagberg
 Last Flight to Moscow (June 1985) by Joseph L Gilmore
 The Normandy Code (July 1985) by Jack Canon
 White Death (Aug. 1985) by Gayle Lynds
 The Assassin Convention (Sept. 1985) by Joseph L Gilmore
 Blood of the Scimitar (Oct. 1985) by Jack Canon
 The Execution Exchange (Nov. 1985) by Dennis Lynds
 The Tarlov Cipher (Dec. 1985) by Jack Canon
 Target Red Star (Jan. 1986) by Jack Canon
 The Killing Ground (Jan. 1986) by David Hagberg
 The Berlin Target (Feb. 1986) by Jack Canon
 Mercenary Mountain (March 1986) by Dennis Lynds
 Blood Ultimatum (April 1986) by Ron Felber
 The Cyclops Conspiracy (May 1986) by Dennis Lynds
 Tunnel for Traitors (June 1986) by Jack Canon
 The Samurai Kill (July 1986) by Dennis Lynds
 Terror Times Two (Aug. 1986) by Jack Canon
 Death Orbit (Sept. 1986) by David Hagberg
 Slaughter Day (Oct. 1986) by Jack Canon
 The Master Assassin (Nov. 1986) by Dennis Lynds
 Operation Petrograd (Dec. 1986) by David Hagberg
 Crossfire Red (Jan. 1987) by Jack Canon
 Blood of the Falcon (Feb. 1987)  By Dennis Lynds
 Death Squad (March 1987) by Jack Canon
 The Terror Code (April 1987) by Jack Canon
 Holy War (May 1987) by Jack Canon
 Blood Raid (June 1987) by Jack Canon
 East of Hell (July 1987) by David Hagberg
 Killing Games (Aug. 1987) by Jack Canon
 Terms of Vengeance (Sept. 1987) by Jack Canon
 Pressure Point (Oct. 1987) by Jack Garside
 Night of the Condor (Nov. 1987) by Gardner F. Fox
 The Poseidon Target (Dec. 1987) by Jack Canon
 The Andropov File (Jan. 1988) by Jack Garside
 Dragonfire (Feb. 1988) by David Hagberg
 Bloodtrail to Mecca (March 1988) by Jack Canon
 Deathstrike (April 1988) by Jack Garside
 Lethal Prey (May 1988) by David Hagberg
 Spykiller (June 1988) by David Hagberg
 Bolivian Heat (July 1988) by Jack Canon
 The Rangoon Man (Aug. 1988) by Jack Canon
 Code Name Cobra (Sept. 1988) by Jack Garside
 Afgan Intercept (Oct. 1988) by Jack Garside
 Countdown to Armageddon (Nov. 1988) by Jack Canon
 Black Sea Bloodbath (Dec. 1988) by Jack Garside
 The Deadly Diva (Jan. 1989) by Jack Canon
 Invitation to Death (Feb. 1989) by David Hagberg
 Day of the Assassin (March 1989) by Jack Canon
 The Korean Kill (April 1989)  Jack Canon
 Middle East Massacre (May 1989) by Jack Canon
 Sanction to Slaughter (June 1989) by Jack Garside
 Holiday in Hell (July 1989) by Jack Canon
 Law of the Lion (Aug. 1989) by Shelly Loewenkopf
 Hong Kong Hit (Sept. 1989) by Jack Canon
 Deep Sea Death (Oct. 1989) by Jack Garside
 Arms of Vengeance (Nov. 1989) by Shelly Loewenkopf
 Hell-Bound Express (Dec. 1989) by Jack Canon
 Isle of Blood (Jan. 1990) by Jack Canon
 Singapore Sling (Feb. 1990) by Jack Garside
 Ruby Red Death(March 1990) by Jack Garside
 Arctic Abduction (April 1990) by Jack Garside
 Dragon Slay (May 1990) by Jack Canon

See also
 Able Team
 Death Merchant
 The Destroyer (novel series)
 The Executioner
 Phoenix Force

References

External links

Carter-Killmaster
Carter-Killmaster
Fictional secret agents and spies
Fictional murderers
Nick Carter (literary character)